The bacterial order Chlamydiales includes only obligately intracellular bacteria that have a chlamydia-like developmental cycle of replication and at least 80% 16S rRNA or 23S rRNA gene sequence identity with other members of Chlamydiales.  Chlamydiales live in animals, insects, and protozoa.

Currently, the order Chlamydiales includes the families Chlamydiaceae, Simkaniaceae, and Waddliaceae, which have Gram-negative extracellular infectious bodies (EBs), and Parachlamydiaceae, which has variable Gram staining of EBs.  The family Rhabdochlamydiaceae has been proposed.

Phylogeny

Taxonomy
The currently accepted taxonomy is based on the List of Prokaryotic names with Standing in Nomenclature (LPSN) and National Center for Biotechnology Information (NCBI)

 Family "Actinochlamydiaceae" Steigen et al. 2013
 ?"Ca. Actinochlamydia" Steigen et al. 2013
 Family "Clavichlamydiaceae" Horn 2011
 "Ca. Clavichlamydia" corrig. Karlsen et al. 2008
 Family "Criblamydiaceae" Thomas, Casson & Greub 2006
 Criblamydia Thomas, Casson & Greub 2006
 Estrella Thomas et al. 2006
 Family Chlamydiaceae Rake 1957
 "Ca. Amphibiichlamydia" Martel et al. 2012
 Chlamydia Jones et al. 1945
 "Chlamydiifrater" Vorimore et al. 2021
 Chlamydophila Everett, Bush & Andersen 1999
 ?"Ca. Medusoplasma" Viver et al. 2017
 Family Parachlamydiaceae Everett, Bush & Andersen 1999
 ?"Ca. Mesochlamydia" Corsaro et al. 2012
 ?"Ca. Metachlamydia" Corsaro et al. 2010
 Neochlamydia Horn et al. 2001
 Parachlamydia Everett, Bush & Andersen 1999
 "Ca. Protochlamydia" Collingro et al. 2005
 "Ca. Rubidus"  Pagnier et al. 2015
 Family Rhabdochlamydiaceae Corsaro et al. 2009
 ?"Ca. Renichlamydia" Corsaro & Work 2012
 "Ca. Rhabdochlamydia" Kostanjsek et al. 2004
 Family Simkaniaceae Everett, Bush & Andersen 1999
 ?"Ca. Fritschea" Everett et al. 2005
 "Ca. Neptunochlamydia" Pizzetti et al. 2016
 Simkania Everett, Bush & Andersen 1999
 ?"Ca. Syngnamydia" Fehr et al. 2013
 Family Waddliaceae Rurangirwa et al. 1999
 Genus Waddlia Rurangirwa et al. 1999

See also
 List of bacterial orders
 List of bacteria genera

References

Chlamydiota
Bacteria orders